The Villa of Livia is an ancient Roman villa at Prima Porta,  north of Rome, Italy, along the Via Flaminia. It may have been part of Livia Drusilla's dowry that she brought when she married Octavian (later called the emperor Augustus), her second husband, in 39 BC. However, it may also have been a gift given to her by Octavian upon their betrothal. The ancient sources (e.g. Suetonius) tell us that Livia returned to this villa following the marriage. It was her sumptuous country residence complementing her house on the Palatine Hill in Rome.

Remarkable frescoes of garden views were found which have since been removed to the Palazzo Massimo museum in Rome.

Location

The villa occupied the height dominating the view down the Tiber Valley to Rome. Some of the walling that retained the villa's terraces can still be seen.

The location was strategically important due to the iron-rich cliffs of red tuff that approach the river Tiber at this point, the confluence of several roads, and the northern entrance to Rome. The name Prima Porta ("First Door") came from an arch of the aqueduct over the Via Flaminia, which brought water to the villa and which travelers saw as the first indication of having reached Rome.

History

It was built and modified in four stages. The earliest stage is of a Republican date, the latest of the time of Constantine the Great.

Its Latin name, Villa Ad Gallinas Albas, referred to its breed of white chickens, which was said by Suetonius to have auspiciously omened origins.

Rediscovery

The site was rediscovered and explored as early as 1596, but it was not recognized as the Villa of Livia until the 19th century. In 1863–1864, a marble krater carved in refined low relief was discovered at the site. On April 20 1863, the famous heroic marble statue of Augustus, the Augustus of Prima Porta, was found at the villa; it is now in the Vatican Museums (Braccio Nuovo). The magisterial Augustus is a marble copy of a bronze statue that celebrated the return in 20 BC of the military standards captured by the Parthians in 53 BC after the defeat of Crassus at Carrhae.

In the 19th century, the villa belonged to the Convent of Santa Maria in Via Lata. The villa and gardens have been excavated and can be visited. There are three vaulted subterranean rooms, the largest of which contained superb illusionistic frescoes of garden views in which all the plants and trees flower and fruit at once. These have since been removed to Rome, where, following cleaning and restoration, they have been reinstalled in the Palazzo Massimo. The vault above the fresco was covered with stucco reliefs, some of which survive.

A new series of more meticulous modern excavations was initiated in 1970. More modern scientific work began at the site in 1995, carried out by the Soprintendenza Archeologica di Roma and directed by Professor Gaetano Messineo, in tandem with the Swedish Institute in Rome.

Garden Room Fresco
The purpose and layout of the Villa Livia are important to the understanding of  both the purpose and layout of the space. The Roman activity of "[d]ining was much more than the satisfaction of human need — it was a ritual of great social and political significance." In terms of layout, the room is underground and dimensionally 40 feet long by 20 feet wide. There are no separating moldings, no painted architecture, and no visible structural elements — the room unexpectedly transports the viewer "outside" in a completely enclosed underground space with a barrel-vaulted ceiling. The enclosure is striking because of the spatial play of the room itself with its illusionistic quality, there is incredible accuracy of plant species, and the variety provides a landscape that in reality cannot exist as one garden. A low stone wall contains the thickest and largest plantings, and in between the viewer and the space rests another fence with a narrow grass walkway. The garden layout encompasses a "perfect combination of variety and abundance with stylization and order" as nature grows freely while simultaneous evidence of human activity is present, specifically as some birds exist in cages and a neatly manicured lawn is visible closest to the dining room space.

References

Sources
 
 M. Carrara, 'ad Gallinas Albas', in Lexicon Topographicum Urbis Romae: Suburbium, vol. III (2005. Rome), p. 17-24
 Jane Clark Reeder, 2001. The Villa of Livia Ad Gallinas Albas. A Study in the Augustan Villa and Garden. in series Archaeologica Transatlantica XX.   (Providence:  Center for Old World Archaeology and Art) (Bryn Mawr Classical Review 20)
 
Allan Klynne and Peter Liljenstolpe. "Where to Put Augustus?: A Note on the Placement of the Prima Porta Statue." American Journal of Philology 121.1 (2000) pp. 121–128.

External links
"Romano Impero"
Robert Piperno, "A Walk to Malborghetto"

Houses completed in the 4th century
Livia
Collections of the National Roman Museum
National museums of Italy
Livia